Church Aston is a civil parish in the district of Telford and Wrekin, Shropshire, England.  It contains 22 listed buildings that are recorded in the National Heritage List for England.  Of these, three are listed at Grade II*, the middle of the three grades, and the others are at Grade II, the lowest grade.  The parish contains the villages of Church Aston and Longford, part of Cheswell, and the surrounding countryside.  At Longford, the main building is Longford Hall, a country house which is listed, together with a number of associated structures.  Also in this village is a church and the surviving chancel of another church, both of which are listed.  Elsewhere most of the listed buildings are houses, cottages, and farm buildings, some of which are timber framed and date from the 17th century, and there is another listed church in Church Aston.


Key

Buildings

Notes and references

Notes

Citations

Sources

Lists of buildings and structures in Shropshire